The New Zealand Rowing Championships is the club championship regatta for New Zealand.

History 
The regatta is held alternatively between Lake Karapiro and Lake Ruataniwha in February over five days each year.

The New Zealand Rowing Championships were first held in 1888 where a four race was held in Wanganui and a single sculls race was held in Wellington. 

The championships have been held every year since with the exception of two intervals during the World Wars.

Clubs race for the Centennial Oar, Centennial Scull and the top rowing association in eight boat events wins the Hallyburton Johnstone Rose Bowl.

Results – men 
Results as they are known are shown in the table below. 2007 & onwards results can be found on the RowitNZ website.

Results – women 
Women first rowed in national championships in 1968, when both titles went to visiting Australian crews. Results as they are known are shown in the table below.

2007 & onwards results can be found on the RowitNZ website

References

Rowing competitions in New Zealand
Rowing